BI 253 is an O2V star in the Large Magellanic Cloud and is a primary standard of the O2 type.  It is one of the hottest main-sequence stars known and one of the most-massive and most-luminous stars known.

Discovery

BI 253 was first catalogued in 1975 as the 253rd of 272 likely O and early B stars in the Large Magellanic Cloud.  In 1995, the spectral type was analysed to be O3 V, the earliest type defined at that time.

When the classification of the earliest type O stars was refined in 2002, the complete lack of neutral helium or doubly ionised nitrogen lines in the spectrum led to BI 253 being placed in a new O2 V class.  It was given a ((f*)) qualifier because of the very weak emission lines of helium and nitrogen.  The most recent published data gives a spectral type of O2V-III(n)((f*)), although it is unclear whether this is due to higher quality spectra or an actual change in the spectrum.

BI 253 has been identified as a runaway star because of its relatively isolated position outside the main star-forming areas of 30 Doradus, and because of its high space velocity.  It was potentially ejected from the R136 cluster about a million years ago.

Properties
BI 253 is one of the hottest, most massive, and most luminous known main sequence stars.

Evolution
BI 253 is still burning hydrogen in its core, but shows enrichment of nitrogen and helium at the surface due to strong rotational and convectional mixing and because of its strong stellar wind.  It is very close to the expected ZAMS position for an  star.  It is expected that stars more massive than BI 253 would show a giant or supergiant luminosity class even on the main sequence.

References

Stars in the Large Magellanic Cloud
Large Magellanic Cloud
Dorado (constellation)
Extragalactic stars
O-type main-sequence stars
Runaway stars
J05373446-6901102
Emission-line stars
O-type giants